Jan Koecher (1908–1981) was a Polish actor. He played the composer Stanisław Moniuszko in the 1951 film Warsaw Premiere.

Selected filmography
 Warsaw Premiere (1951)
 The Ashes (1965)
 The Doll (1968)

References

Bibliography 
 Falkowska, Janina. Andrzej Wajda: History, Politics, and Nostalgia in Polish Cinema. Berghahn Books, 2007.

External links 
 

1908 births
1981 deaths
Polish male film actors
Male actors from Warsaw
People from Warsaw Governorate
20th-century Polish male actors